David Dyer may refer to:

David Dyer (cricketer) (born 1946), South African cricketer
David Patterson Dyer (1838–1924), U.S. federal judge
David W. Dyer (1910–1998), American lawyer and judge